Grigoris Charalampidis (born 6 January 1958) is a Greek former footballer who played as a forward in the Alpha Ethniki throughout the 1980s. He was capped eight times for the Greece national football team.

Career
Charalampidis began his career at Doxa Drama in 1979. In 1981, he joined Panathinaikos, where he stayed for five years. In 1986, he joined OFI Crete. He ended his career at Pezoporikos Larnaca in 1990.

References

1958 births
Living people
Footballers from Drama, Greece
Greek footballers
Greece international footballers
Association football forwards
Doxa Drama F.C. players
Panathinaikos F.C. players
OFI Crete F.C. players
Pezoporikos Larnaca players
Super League Greece players
Football League (Greece) players